The Screen Award for Best Actress is one of the Screen Awards of merit presented annually by a distinguished panel of judges from the Indian "Bollywood" film industry, to recognise an actress who has delivered an outstanding performance in a Supporting role. Though the awards began in 1994, the best supporting category for actresses was not introduced until 1995.

Winners and nominees

† - Indicates the performance also "Won" the Filmfare Award for Best Supporting Actress.
‡ - Indicates the performance was also "Nominated" for the Filmfare Award for Best Supporting Actress.

1990s

2000s

2010s

2020

See also
 Screen Awards
 Bollywood
 Cinema of India

References

Screen Awards
Film awards for supporting actress